The allegory of the long spoons is a parable that shows the difference between heaven and hell by means of people forced to eat with long spoons. It is attributed to Rabbi Haim of Romshishok, as well as other sources.

The allegory can be summarized as follows:
In each location, the inhabitants are given access to food, but the utensils are too unwieldy to serve oneself with.  In hell, the people cannot cooperate, and consequently starve. In heaven, the diners feed one another across the table and are sated.

The story can encourage people to be kind to each other. There are various interpretations of the fable including its use in sermons and in advice to lonely people.

Interpretation 
The story suggests that people have the opportunity to use what they are given (the long spoons in this allegory) to help nourish each other, but the problem, as Haim points out, lies in how the people treat each other.

Given the same level playing field one group of people who treat each other well will create a pleasant environment, whereas another group of people, given exactly the same tools to work with, can create unpleasant conditions simply by how they treat each other. Writer Dawn Eden suggests that this is a simple truth which can be easily forgotten by lonely people unable to see their situation clearly. She argues that such situations can be improved by reaching out to others.

Variations 
The long spoons allegory has become part of the folklore of several cultures, for example: Jewish, Hindu, Buddhist, "Oriental" (Middle-Eastern) and Christian. In medieval Europe, the food in the story is a bowl of stew; in China, it is a bowl of rice being eaten with long chopsticks.

In some versions of the story the diners are using regular cutlery but are unable to bend their arms, with a story attributed to Rabbi Haim of Romshishok describing how "both arms were splinted with wooden slats so he could not bend either elbow to bring the food to his mouth".

One variant of the allegory was used by the League of Nations to assist with postwar peace after World War II.

Art and popular culture
While the parable itself is seldom depicted in art, it is well known and used in sermons when referring to hell, where the fashion for depicting hell in terrible, painful, gruesome terms is fading in recent times.

The parable is told by Norman McCay in the novelization of Kingdom Come. In the 2011 Boardwalk Empire episode "Under God's Power She Flourishes", Father Brennan tells Margaret the allegory of the long spoons while Emily is fitted for leg braces. A scene in the 2013 thriller The East draws strong comparisons to the allegory when protagonist Sarah is depicted as selfish for neglecting to feed her adjacent diner while in a straitjacket. It is also retold in Barbara Kingsolver's novel The Bean Trees. The plot of 2019's The Platform has also been compared to the allegory.

Caritas made an animation video based on this allegory for their campaign "One human family, food for all".

The visit of the second ghost in the Ms. Scrooge 1997 film has been compared to the long spoons allegory.

The Asian version of the proverb is told by the character Bode in the Simpsons episode "Warrin' Priests".

See also
 Afterlife
 The Golden Rule
 Jewish folklore
 Towards a Global Ethic: An Initial Declaration
 World peace

References

Allegory
Religious pluralism
Jewish folklore
Parables
Afterlife